Warracknabeal Airport  is located about  south of Warracknabeal, Victoria, Australia on the Henty Highway towards Horsham. It is within the locality of Kellalac.

See also
 List of airports in Victoria

References

Airports in Victoria (Australia)
Warracknabeal